This is a list of Annual Meeting locations for the Midwest Regional Conservation Guild (MRCG), which has been in existence since 1980 but had its first meeting in 1981.

External links
 Google Map showing locations of all meetings

References

Conservation and restoration organizations
Arts organizations based in the United States
Midwestern United States
1980 establishments in the United States
Lists of museums in the United States